The women's coxless four competition at the 2016 World Rowing Championships in Rotterdam took place at the Willem-Alexander Baan.

Schedule
The schedule was as follows:

All times are Central European Summer Time (UTC+2)

Results

Heats
Heat winners advanced directly to the final. The remaining boats were sent to the repechage.

Heat 1

Heat 2

Repechage
The four fastest boats advanced to the final. The remaining boat took no further part in the competition.

Final
The final determined the rankings.

References

2016 World Rowing Championships
World